Belippo terribilis is a species of jumping spiders in the genus Belippo that lives in Kenya. It was first identified in 2015.

References

Endemic fauna of Kenya
Fauna of Kenya
Salticidae
Spiders of Africa
Spiders described in 2015
Taxa named by Wanda Wesołowska